The Sands Replica 1929 Primary Glider is an American high-wing, wire-braced single-seat, primary glider that was designed by Ron Sands Sr for amateur construction, with kits supplied by Wicks Aircraft Supply. The plans are now sold by Sands' son, Ron Sands Jr.

Design and development
Sands developed his replica 1929-style primary glider from the original designs of that era. He promotes it as "much safer than hang gliders or ultralights... [an] excellent project for school or clubs".

The aircraft is made from wood, tube and doped aircraft fabric. Its  span wing is cable-braced from a king post and employs a Clark Y airfoil. Like all primary gliders the cockpit is just a seat mounted on the keel with no windshield fitted. The landing gear is a fixed skid, fitted to the underside of the keel. The aircraft is designed to be bungee launched from a slope or auto-towed. The aircraft can be disassembled for storage or ground transportation.

Sands estimates that construction takes 200 hours. In 2011 plans cost US$40 and included two 24" by 36" (60 X 90 cm) sheets, a materials list and "Safety Tips". In 2015 the available Wicks five part kit totaled US$7644.14.

Variants
Plans for a steel tube fuselage version are also available.

Specifications (1929 Primary Glider)

See also

References

External links

Replica 1929 Primary Glider
1980s United States sailplanes
Homebuilt aircraft
High-wing aircraft